455 North Park Drive or Loews Hotel Tower, also known as Loews North Park Drive, is a 54-story  tall skyscraper located at 455 North Park Drive in Chicago, Illinois that is owned by Loews Hotels. The 52-floor building has  of floor space. It has 400 hotel rooms, 398 rental apartments, and assorted ballrooms, bars, restaurants and parking spaces. All apartments were sold for $240.4 million. It is based on a "L" shaped twelve-storey podium. It was the tallest building built in the city in 2015.

It was designed by Chicago architects Solomon Cordwell Buenz and developed by the DRW Trading Group of Chicago. The construction cost was about $200 million.

See also
List of tallest buildings in Chicago

References

External links

Skyscraperpage 

Residential skyscrapers in Chicago
Loews Hotels
Skyscraper hotels in Chicago
2015 establishments in Illinois
Hotel buildings completed in 2015
Residential buildings completed in 2015